Operation Provide Hope was a humanitarian operation conducted by the U.S. Air Force to provide medical equipment to former Soviet republics during their transition to capitalism.  The operation was announced by Secretary of State James A. Baker, III on January 22–23, 1992 and the initial shipment of supplies was sent on February 10, 1992. Sixty-five C-5 and C-141 missions flew  of food and medical supplies to 24 locations in the Commonwealth of Independent States during the initial launch. Much of these supplies was left over from the buildup to the Persian Gulf War.

For nearly two weeks, US Air Force C-5A’s and C-141’s delivered several hundred tons of emergency food, medicines, and medical supplies to all twelve new independent states of the former Soviet Union, not only to each capital city but also to several outlying cities, especially across Russia.  Small teams of US personnel from various government agencies (On-Site Inspection Agency, USAID, and USDA) had been placed in each destination shortly before the deliveries, to coordinate with local officials and to monitor to the best extent possible that the deliveries reached the intended recipients (i.e., orphanages, hospitals, soup kitchens, and needy families).  

Following the initial shipment, Phase II of the operation began, consisting of continuing support of the former Soviet republics.  Food and medical supplies were shipped by sea, land, and air from Europe.  In all, 25,000 short tons of food and medicine were sent to 33 cities in the former Soviet Union.  The final stage of the operation was to build, staff, and train hospitals throughout the former Soviet Union.

The operation concluded in September 1994.

References

External links
Operation Provide Hope: Ten Years and Counting

1992 in Russia
Provide Hope
Humanitarian aid
Post-Soviet states
Commonwealth of Independent States
Russia–United States relations